is a railway station in Suruga-ku, Shizuoka, Shizuoka Prefecture, Japan, operated by the private railway company, Shizuoka Railway (Shizutetsu).

Lines
Shin-Shimizu  Station is a terminal station on the Shizuoka–Shimizu Line and is 11.0 kilometers from the opposing terminus of the line at Shin-Shizuoka Station.

Station layout
The station has a double bay platform. The station consists of two entrances on the east and west sides of the station. The main station building is located on the east side of the station. Both entrances have automated ticket machines, and automated turnstiles.

Platforms

Adjacent stations

Station history
It was renamed  in 1918, and Shimizu Aioi-cho Station in 1933. It was renamed to its present name on October 1, 1954.

Passenger statistics
In fiscal 2017, the station was used by an average of 3039 passengers daily (boarding passengers only).

Surrounding area
former Shimizu City Hall
Shimizu Station

See also
 List of railway stations in Japan

References

External links

 Shizuoka Railway official website

Railway stations in Shizuoka Prefecture
Railway stations in Japan opened in 1908
Railway stations in Shizuoka (city)